Carson Gulley (June 9, 1897 – November 2, 1962) was head chef at the University of Wisconsin–Madison from 1926 to 1954. He is known in part for popularizing a recipe for fudge-bottom pie that is still served on campus today. The refectory where he once served as head chef is now known as Carson Gulley Commons. It was the first university building at the University of Wisconsin–Madison to be named after an African American.

Gulley was also a local pioneer in television and radio cooking programming. From 1953 to 1962, Gulley had his own weekly cooking show, called "What's Cooking", on local television station WMTV. Also, in 1953, he hosted a twice-weekly local radio cooking program, called "WIBA Cooking School of the Air", and each month compiled the program's recipes in booklets that listeners could request by mail. He and his wife Beatrice were the first African American couple to host their own television show in Wisconsin in the 1950s.

He led the Madison branch of the NAACP. Having failed for many years to buy a house in Madison, he made an emotional appeal to the Madison City Council's Committee on Human Rights. This in part led to the City Council passing a Fair Housing Ordinance.

He published his first book Seasoning Secrets: Herbs and Spices in 1949 at the suggestion of George Washington Carver.

Early life
Gulley was born in Zama, Nevada County, Arkansas to a family of sharecroppers. He was one of ten children.

Bibliography
 Seasoning Secrets: Herbs and Spices, 1949; revised 1956

References

External links
 Fudge-bottom pie taste test
 The Carson Gulley Cookbook Collection
 Newly remodeled Carson Gulley Center is open for dining, events

1897 births
1962 deaths
Activists for African-American civil rights
American male chefs
People from Nevada County, Arkansas